Al-Qubeiba is a Palestinian town in the Jerusalem Governorate of Palestine, located 2 kilometers northwest of Jerusalem in the central West Bank. According to the Palestinian Central Bureau of Statistics in 2010, the village had a population of 3,321. Al-Qubeiba lies at an altitude of 783m to 795m above sea-level. It is located in a conflict area near the border with Israel between Ramallah and Jerusalem. The settlement of Giv'on HaHadashah lies 5 km southeast of al-Qubeiba. It is surrounded by the town of Biddu (east), Beit 'Anan (northwest), Qatanna (southwest), and Kharayib Umm al-Lahim (west). Unlike the surrounding region, al-Qubeiba has large areas covered with pine and olive trees.

History

Crusader to Mamluk period
In the Crusader era a new Frankish village was erected along the still extant Roman road and received the name Parva Mahomeria. In 1159 it was mentioned in a document defining its borders with Beit 'Anan.

After the expulsion of the Crusaders from the Holy Land, the next Christian established presence in Palestine were the Franciscan custodians of the holy sites. During the 13th century Qubeibeh was gradually adopted by pilgrims as the location of Emmaus, the village mentioned in Luke 24:13-35, eventually replacing Abu Ghosh in this function. From 1335 on the Franciscans adopted it too and began an annual pilgrimage to this site.

Late Ottoman period
In 1838 el-Kubeibeh was noted as a Muslim village, part of Beni Malik area, located west of Jerusalem.

In 1863 the French explorer Victor Guérin described it as a village of a hundred people who lived in old houses, each consisting of a single vaulted room.

An Ottoman village list from about 1870 found that el-kubebe had a population of 79, in 12 houses, though the population count included only men.

In 1883, the PEF's Survey of Western Palestine described it as a "village of moderate size, standing on a flat ridge with a few olives to the west. [..] To the west is a monastery of Latin monks, established in 1862." A ruined Crusader church was noted.

In 1896 the population of El-kubebe was estimated to be about 144 persons.

British Mandate period
In the 1922 census of Palestine conducted by the British Mandate authorities, Al-Qubeiba had a population of 236 inhabitants, consisting of 26 Christians and 210  Muslims, where all the Christians were Roman Catholics. This had increased in the 1931 census to 316, 55 Christians and 261 Muslim, in 83 residential houses.

In the 1945 statistics Al-Qubeiba had a population of 420; 340 Muslims and 80 Christians, with 3,184 dunams of land, according to an official land and population survey. Of this, 534 dunams were plantations and irrigable land, 1,032 used for cereals, while 22 dunams were built-up land.

Jordanian period
In the wake of the 1948 Arab–Israeli War, and after the 1949 Armistice Agreements, Al-Qubeiba came under Jordanian rule. It was annexed by Jordan in 1950.

In 1961, the population of Qubeiba was  701, of whom 116 were Christian, the rest Muslim.

Post-1967
Since the Six-Day War in 1967 Al-Qubeiba has been under Israeli occupation. The population in the 1967 census conducted by the Israeli authorities was 688, of whom 21 originated from the Israeli territory.

After the 1995 Oslo accords, 53.3% of village land was classified as Area B, and the remaining 46.2% as Area C. Israel has expropriated more than 500 dunams of village land in order to construct the West Bank barrier.

Tourism

Al-Qubeiba is known for its cool climate during the summertime and its natural landscape. The village serves as a tourist destination because it is home to St. Cleophas Church, an over-a-century-old Franciscan church that was built on the remains of a Crusader precursor at the very place where Jesus Christ is thought to have shared bread with two of his disciples. The village has remains of the cobble-stoned Roman road that connected the coastal city of Jaffa to Jerusalem. This historic road is surrounded by remains of Crusader houses.

Of the three major candidates identified with Emmaus, Al-Qubeiba is the only one located in the Palestinian territories, which means that if visitors are coming from Israel access can be more difficult. For pilgrims it is advisable to coordinate a visit with the offices of the Franciscans. For individual travellers it is useful to contact the Christian Information Center in Jerusalem. For more access information, see below under "Transportation".

Geopolitical status
Al-Qubeiba along with Beit Duqqu, Beit 'Anan, Beit Surik, Qatanna, Biddu, Beit Ijza, Kharayib Umm al-Lahim and at-Tira form the "Biddu enclave". The enclave is linked to Ramallah by underpasses and a road that is fenced on both sides. From the "Biddu enclave" Palestinians will travel along a fenced road that passes under a bypass road to Bir Nabala enclave, then on a second underpass under Bypass Road 443 to Ramallah.

Diaa' A-Din 'Abd al-Karim Ibrahim Abu 'Eid was shot dead by gunfire during an anti-barrier demonstration on 18 April 2004. Muhammad Fadel Hashem Rian and Zakaria Mahmoud 'Eid Salem were shot dead during anti-barrier demonstrations on 26 February 2004 at Beit Ijaz (a satellite village of Biddu).

Transportation
Al-Qubeiba is accessible only by road (via service-shuttles or buses) from either Ramallah or Jerusalem. Nonetheless, due to the closure of the roads from the village to Jerusalem during the second intifada, only those with foreign passports or with the Jerusalem ID cards can reach the village from Jerusalem. This leaves the only possible access to the village to be from Ramallah via buses #40 and #45 and the service shuttles destined to al-Qubeiba, Qatannah, and Beit 'Anan (all found in the southern public transportation station in Ramallah, just across from the Yasser Arafat Square "al-Sa'a Square" in the city). Several mini-vans operate on the road between al-Qubeiba and the neighboring villages and towns.

Education
Al-Qubeiba has two government-run schools (one mixed-gender elementary and another all-girls secondary schools). It also enjoys several kindergartens and pre-schools. The village also houses the "al-Qubeiba Nursing School" that operates in association with the Bethlehem University School of Nursing to provide students with a bachelor's degree in nursing.

Health
The medical facilities for al-Qubeiba are classified as level 2 according to the Palestinian National Authority Ministry of Health. Governmental primary and secondary health care clinics operate in the village in addition to a German-run clinic. Several other private medical and dental clinics also exist.

Government
The village is run by a village council elected every four years and is mainly funded by the Palestinian Ministry of Local Authority. Al-Qubeiba has a locally funded-and-run "al-Qubeiba Club" that provides numerous educational, vocational, sports, and scout activities to the residents of the village. The village also enjoys the presence of one park (with an outdoor semi-olympic swimming pool) and two large multi-purpose halls for weddings and other major events. It also has a fully automated modern olive press that operates to service farmers from the village and the neighboring villages and towns, being one of the few olive presses in the West Bank licensed to produce extra virgin organic olive oil.

References

Bibliography

   (pp. 475 ff)
 

 
 

 
  
   
 (p.     8)
  
 (pp.   235, 260)
       ( p. 323)
  (p.  65)

External links
Welcome To al-Qubayba
Survey of Western Palestine, Map 17:    IAA, Wikimedia commons 
Al Qubeibah Village (Fact Sheet),   Applied Research Institute–Jerusalem, (ARIJ)
Al Qubeiba Village Profile, ARIJ 
Al Qubeiba  aerial photo, ARIJ 
Locality Development Priorities and Needs in Al Qubeiba, ARIJ

Villages in the West Bank
Jerusalem Governorate
Municipalities of the State of Palestine